The following roads may be referred to as Route 13 or Highway 13. For a list of roads named A13, see List of A13 roads.

International
 Asian Highway 13
 European route E13 
 European route E013

Afghanistan
The Kabul–Behsud Highway - National Highway 13

Australia

Queensland 
 Mount Lindesay Highway - National Route 13

South Australia 
 - SA

Austria
 Brenner Autobahn

Bolivia
 Route 13 (Bolivia)

Canada
 Alberta Highway 13
 British Columbia Highway 13
 Manitoba Highway 13
 Newfoundland and Labrador Route 13
 Prince Edward Island Route 13
 Quebec Autoroute 13
 Saskatchewan Highway 13

Czech Republic
 I/13 Highway; Czech: Silnice I/13

Dominican Republic
 DR-13

Estonia

India
  National Highway 13 (India)

Ireland
 N13 road (Ireland)

Israel
Highway 13 (Israel)

Italy
 Autostrada A13
 RA 13
 State road 13

Japan
 Japan National Route 13
 Tōhoku-Chūō Expressway

Korea, South
 National Route 13
Gukjido 13

Laos
 National Road 13 (Laos)

Norway
 Norwegian County Road 13
 Norwegian National Road 13

Paraguay
 National Route 13

Poland 
  National road 13

Sweden
 Swedish national road 13

United States
 Interstate 13 (former proposal)
 U.S. Route 13
 New England Interstate Route 13 (former)
 Alabama State Route 13
 Arkansas Highway 13
 California State Route 13
 County Route A13 (California)
 County Route E13 (California)
 County Route G13 (California)
 County Route J13 (California)
 County Route S13 (California)
 Colorado State Highway 13
 Florida State Road 13
 Florida State Road 13 (former)
 County Road 13 (Flagler County, Florida)
 County Road 13 (Orange County, Florida)
 County Road 13 (St. Johns County, Florida)
 County Road 13B (St. Johns County, Florida)
 Georgia State Route 13
 Hawaii Route 13 (former)
 Idaho State Highway 13
 Illinois Route 13
 Indiana State Road 13
 Iowa Highway 13
 K-13 (Kansas highway)
 Kentucky Route 13
 Louisiana Highway 13
 Louisiana State Route 13 (former)
 Massachusetts Route 13
 M-13 (Michigan highway)
 Minnesota State Highway 13
 County Road 13 (Goodhue County, Minnesota)
 County Road 13 (Hennepin County, Minnesota)
 County Road 13 (St. Louis County, Minnesota)
 County Road 13 (Washington County, Minnesota)
 Mississippi Highway 13
 Missouri Route 13
 Montana Highway 13
 Nebraska Highway 13
 Nebraska Spur 13C
 Nebraska Spur 13D
 Nebraska Spur 13F
 Nebraska Spur 13H
 Nebraska Spur 13K
 Nebraska Recreation Road 13L
 Nebraska Recreation Road 13M
 Nebraska Recreation Road 13N
 Nebraska Recreation Road 13P
 Nevada State Route 13 (former)
 New Hampshire Route 13
 New Jersey Route 13
 New Jersey Route 13E (former)
 County Route 13 (Monmouth County, New Jersey)
 County Route 13B (Monmouth County, New Jersey)
 New Mexico State Road 13
 New York State Route 13
 County Route 13 (Allegany County, New York)
 County Route 13B (Allegany County, New York)
 County Route 13C (Allegany County, New York)
 County Route 13 (Chemung County, New York)
 County Route 13 (Chenango County, New York)
 County Route 13 (Dutchess County, New York)
 County Route 13 (Franklin County, New York)
 County Route 13 (Genesee County, New York)
 County Route 13 (Greene County, New York)
 County Route 13 (Herkimer County, New York)
 County Route 13 (Jefferson County, New York)
 County Route 13 (Lewis County, New York)
 County Route 13 (Niagara County, New York)
 County Route 13 (Oneida County, New York)
 County Route 13 (Onondaga County, New York)
 County Route 13 (Putnam County, New York)
 County Route 13 (Rockland County, New York)
 County Route 13 (Schoharie County, New York)
 County Route 13 (Schuyler County, New York)
 County Route 13 (Steuben County, New York)
 County Route 13 (Suffolk County, New York)
 County Route 13 (Sullivan County, New York)
 County Route 13 (Ulster County, New York)
 North Carolina Highway 13 (1920s) (former)
 North Carolina Highway 13 (1930s) (former)
 North Carolina Highway 13 (1935–1951) (former)
 North Dakota Highway 13
 Ohio State Route 13
 Oklahoma State Highway 13 (1924) (former)
 Oklahoma State Highway 13 (1930s-1970s) (former)
 Pennsylvania Route 13 (former)
 South Dakota Highway 13
 Tennessee State Route 13
 Texas State Highway 13 (former)
 Texas State Highway Loop 13
 Farm to Market Road 13
 Texas Park Road 13
 Utah State Route 13
 Virginia State Route 13
 State Route 13 (Virginia 1918-1933) (former)
 Washington State Highway 13 (former)
 Wisconsin Highway 13
 Wyoming Highway 13

Uruguay
  Route 13 Bartolomé Hidalgo

Vietnam
 National Road 13 (Vietnam)

See also
 List of A13 roads
 List of highways numbered 13A